Iron River may refer to:

Communities
United States
 Iron River Township, Michigan
 Iron River, Michigan, a city in the township
 Iron River, Wisconsin, a town
 Iron River (CDP), Wisconsin, an unincorporated community and census-designated place within the town

Canada
 Iron River, Alberta, a hamlet

Waterways in the United States
 Iron River (Iron County, Michigan)
 Iron River (Marquette County, Michigan)

See also
 Big Iron River, Michigan